Damasus albicans is a species of beetle in the leaf beetle family. It is the only member of the genus Damasus, and was first described by the Belgian entomologist Félicien Chapuis in 1874. The species is distributed in Syria and Turkey.

References

Eumolpinae
Beetles of Asia
Insects of the Middle East
Insects of Turkey
Arthropods of Syria
Taxa named by Félicien Chapuis
Beetles described in 1874